Cowen Run is a stream in the U.S. state of Ohio.

Cowen Run was named in honor of a local family. A variant name was "Cowens Run".

References

Rivers of Warren County, Ohio
Rivers of Ohio